Tit Gom (also Romanized as Tīt Gom) is a village in Darreh Kayad Rural District, Sardasht District, Dezful County, Khuzestan Province, Iran. At the 2006 census, its population was 39, in 5 families.

References 

Populated places in Dezful County